Karl August Walther (30 April 1902 – after 1964) was a German writer and publisher.

Life 
Born in Bielefeld, Walther was a member of the editorial staff of the cultural magazine Der Türmer, which was published under the direction of Friedrich Lienhard who was positioned as völkisch. Walther became increasingly radicalised and became a member of the Nazi Militant League for German Culture.

Walther was one of the visitors of the  organised by Hans Grimm.

At times, the journal was subtitled "Monatsschrift für nationalsozialistische Lebensauffassung" (Monthly Journal for National Socialist views of life) and stated as its goal "to eradicate the destructive spirit of materialism". Walther's journal played an important pivotal role between national conservatives authors and the more radical National Socialist Cultural Revolutionaries.

After the Machtergreifung, construction was accelerated and the stage opened on 20 April 1933 with a performance of Hanns Johst's play Schlageter.

Walther moved to Potsdam and became treasurer of the newly founded . The "Wartburg-Waldbühne", of which Walther was chairman, regularly hosted concerts and theatre performances until it was destroyed in the war.

After the Second World War, Walther emigrated to Lucerne in Switzerland, where he was the owner of the Montana publishing house.

In 1950, Walther met Konrad Adenauer and later organised his visit to the place of pilgrimage Sachseln.

Publications 
 Jugendwandern, romantische Dichtung, 1921/24
 Vom Ehrenhain in Bad Berka, 1926
 Vom Reichsehrenmal, zus. m.
 Das Erbe der Väter, Wegweiser zum Geistesvermächtnis Deutschen Führertums, zus. m. Albert Böhme, 1928
 Das Langemarck-Buch der Deutschen Studentenschaft, 1931
 Die Wartburgwaldbühne in Eisenach, 1933
 Neues Volk auf alter Erde, 1935
 Deutsches Volk in Arbeit und Wehr, 1937
Vom Meer zum Bodensee, Der Hochrhein als Großschiffahrtsweg, 1957
Wasser – bedrohtes Lebenselement, 1964
 Persönliche Erinnerungen von Karl August Walther – Zu Gast bei Konrad Adenauer, in the Luzerner Tagblatt, 2 August 1980.

Further reading 
 Kürschners Deutscher Literatur-Kalender: 1943.
 Archiv für Geschichte des Buchwesens, vol. 40, Monika Estermann, Reinhard Wittmann, De Gruyter Saur, 1993, .
 Thomas Dietzel; : Deutsche literarische Zeitschriften : 1880 – 1945; ein Repertorium. Vol. 1. 1 – 764: A travers les Vosges – Deutsch-nordisches Jahrbuch. Munich: Saur, 1988, # 1360, page 569.
 : "Deutsche Religion" and "Deutsche Kunst“". Intellektuelle Sinnsuche und kulturelle Identitätskonstruktionen in der "Klassischen Moderne". University of Jena, 2006.
 Thomas Vordermayer: Bildungsbürgertum und völkische Ideologie – Konstitution und gesellschaftliche Tiefenwirkung eines Netzwerks völkischer Autoren (1919–1959), De Gruyter Oldenbourg, 2016.
 Lothar Ehrlich, Justus H. Ulbricht: Das Dritte Weimar – Klassik und Kultur im Nationalsozialismus, 1999.
 Michael Assmann,  (ed.): Zwischen Kritik und Zuversicht: 50 Jahre Deutsche Akademie für Sprache und Dichtung, Göttingen, Wallstein , 1999.
Online 4 January 2013.

References

External links 
 

German male writers
Militant League for German Culture members
1902 births
Date of death unknown
Writers from Bielefeld